The Self-Starter Foundation is a New York City-based independent record label founded in 1994 by Chris Newmyer. Artists who have released records on the label include Enon, Les Savy Fav, Lifter Puller, and Palomar.

External links
www.selfstarterfoundation.com

American record labels